"Freaks" is a song by American surf rock band Surf Curse. It was originally released in 2013, from the band's first studio album Buds. The song was re-released as a single on May 15, 2021, via Atlantic Records.

Content
The band wrote the song in 2011, but in 2020, the song garnered attention due to Internet memes, gaining more than 200,000 views on TikTok and 200 million streams. Responding to the viral memes, the band's guitarist Jacob Rubeck told American Songwriter: "It's a very strange trajectory. It's been a strange wave". He also described "Freaks" as "a pretty depressing song, but there are a lot of depressed people out there, and people who feel alienated".

Adam Schulz, the band's A&R rep at Atlantic, told Los Angeles Times: "When I heard 'Freaks' for the first time, the thing that stood out to me was how exhilarating the song is, that energy is consistent across the band's catalog, and once you watch videos of the band performing live, you realize it translates even better in real life."

Music video
An accompanying music video was released on August 6, 2021, and directed by the band itself. They talked about the video via TV News Desk: "We never had any intention to make a music video for 'Freaks', but when the opportunity occurred we knew what it needed to be, we had to make a video set in Charles Burns' Black Hole world, which originally inspired the song. We were lucky to cast our friends and put them in this mutant makeup. We were lucky to capture great moments on film and had an opportunity to make an ode to a graphic novel that heavily inspired us."

Charts

Weekly charts

Year-end charts

Certifications

Release history

References

2021 singles
2013 songs
2021 songs
Atlantic Records singles
Surf rock songs